Dr. Jekyll and Mr. Hyde is a 1913 horror film based on Robert Louis Stevenson's 1886 gothic novella Strange Case of Dr. Jekyll and Mr. Hyde. Directed by Herbert Brenon for producer Carl Laemmle's company IMP (which he later changed to Universal Pictures), the production stars King Baggot in the dual role of Jekyll and Hyde. The film was re-released in the United States in August 1927.

Plot 
Dr. Henry Jekyll (King Baggot) sends a note to his fiancée, Alice (Jane Gail), and her father (Matt B. Snyder) to say that instead of accompanying them to the opera, he must give more time to his charity patients. At Jekyll’s practice, his friends Dr. Lanyon (Howard Crampton) and Utterson (William Sorrel), a lawyer, ridicule him for what they consider his dangerous research. Alice and her father also visit Jekyll’s rooms, but although apologetic, the doctor insists on devoting his time to his patients. That night, however, Jekyll undertakes a dangerous experiment, swallowing a drug intended to releases his evil self. His body convulses, and he transforms into a hunched, twisted figure.

The strange creature emerges from Jekyll’s room, bearing a note in Jekyll’s handwriting that orders the household staff to treat the stranger – “Mr Hyde” – as himself. Hyde then slips out into the night, terrorizing the patrons of a nearby tavern before finding himself lodgings. From these rooms, he begins a career of evil, until one night he attacks and injures a crippled child. Outraged witnesses corner Hyde and force him to agree to compensate the boy. Hyde reluctantly leads one man back to Jekyll’s house and gives him money. During this passage of events, a worried Dr. Utterson sees Hyde entering Jekyll’s house. Inside, Hyde takes a potion that transforms him back to Jekyll. The doctor swears that he will abandon his experiments and never tempt fate again; but that night, without taking the drug, he turns spontaneously into Hyde.

Cast
 King Baggot as Dr. Henry Jekyll/Mr. Hyde
 Jane Gail as Alice, Dr. Jekyll's fiance
 Matt B. Snyder as Alice's father
 Howard Crampton as Dr. Lanyon
 William Sorelle as Utterson, the attorney
 Herbert Brenon

Critique
Like so many other performers of this period, it was standard practice for the actors to apply their own make-up. While assuming the dual role of Jekyll and Hyde, King Baggot employed a variety of different greasepaints and a tangled mass of crepe hair. Through the use of camera dissolves, Baggot was able to achieve the transformation. Critic Troy Howarth felt that "it gave him the chance to 
play a difficult dual role, but his performance has not aged well....his hunched over walk comes across as forced and ridiculous...evoking comparisons with Jerry Lewis'....performance as The Nutty Professor....with his unruly hair and prominent buckteeth".

The film used a slow dissolve effect to show the transformation, as opposed to a quick matching cut, and the critics were impressed, George Blaisdell of Moving Picture World commenting "It is through the means of the dissolving process that the transformation is made peculiarly effective...You see the change of the man of good to the man of evil right before your eyes".

References

External links

1913 films
American science fiction horror films
American silent short films
American black-and-white films
Dr. Jekyll and Mr. Hyde films
Films directed by Herbert Brenon
1910s science fiction horror films
1910s American films
1913 horror films
Silent science fiction horror films